Umm Shareek, was a female companion of Muhammad.

Biography
During the 620s, when Islam was new, the ruling class of Mecca used to torture people who accepted Islam in order to have them renounce their new faith.

Umm Shareek, a lady who accepted Islam, was made to stand under the hot sun for three days and was not allowed to drink water.

See also
Sahaba

References

650s deaths
7th-century Arabs
Women companions of the Prophet
Persecution of Muslims
Torture victims